Mylothris rembina, the smoky dotted border, is a butterfly in the family Pieridae. It is found in Nigeria, Cameroon, Equatorial Guinea, Bioko, São Tomé and Príncipe, Gabon, the western part of the Democratic Republic of the Congo and northern Angola. The habitat consists of forests.

Adults have been recorded feeding on Lantana species.

References

Seitz, A. Die Gross-Schmetterlinge der Erde 13: Die Afrikanischen Tagfalter. Plate XIII 12

Butterflies described in 1880
Pierini
Butterflies of Africa